Bangiya Bijnan Parishad is a science organization founded by Satyendra Nath Bose in 1948. As a science organization, the Bangiya Bijnan Parishad led the Science-Movement. Nowadays, many science movement organization take the inspiration from Bangiya Bijnan Parishad directly or indirectly.

From the Commencement, Bangiya Bijnan Parishad publishes a monthly journal of science in Bengali language, named Jnan-O-Bijnan since January 1948.

In 1948 Gopal Chandra Bhattacharya worked with Satyendra Nath Bose (of Bose–Einstein statistics fame) to establish the society for science research.

History
To spread the knowledge of science in our own Mother tongue, Satyendra Nath Bose determined to found a science organization in Bengal. On 18 October 1947, some Science fond of Calcutta Science College decided to established a science organization. On 25 January 1948, Bangiya Bijnan Parishad was founded by Satyendra Nath Bose. It take some determination like to spread the science in Mother tongue, to make the science easy for the school student using appropriate word in Bengali, to publish science book and magazine for school and college student etc. As the mouthpiece of the council the Jnan-O-Bijnan magazine was published in the founding Day.

Current Committee 
President: Sumitra Choudhari

 

Vice-President: Aparajita Basu, Shyamal Chakraborty, Bholanath Dutta, Amit Krishna De

 

Secretary: Gautam Gangopadhyay

 

Assistant Secretary: Sima Mukhopadhyay, Saibal Kumar Guha, Sunish Kumar Deb

 

Treasurer: Tapan Saha

Members: 

 Sasadhar Biswas, Shatabdi Das, Kamal Bikash Banerjee, Arunabha Mishra, Jyashree Dutta, Tapan Mohan Chakraborty, Putul Chakraborty, Tanmoy Rudra, Nemai Duttagupta, Balaram Majumder, Prabir Bhattacharya, Shambhu Nandi, Soumitra Kumar Chaudhury, Ujjal Mukherjee, Tarun Das, Mahadeb Bhattacharya

Advisors: 

 Amalendu Bandyopadhyay, Arup Raychaudhuri, Anandadeb Mukhopadhyay, Tarashankar Bandyopadhyay, Partha Ghosh, Pradip Narayan Ghosh, Bikash Sinha, Shantipada Gonchodhury, Sibaji Raha, Samar Bagchi, Subimal Sen, Suranjan Das, Amitabha Raychaudhuri, Uday Banerjee, Debashis Mukherjee, Samit Kumar Ray

References

Indic literature societies
Scientific organisations based in India